Adil Ibrahim (born 6 February) is an Indian actor, radio jockey, television host and model. In 2014, he debuted in Sanjeev Sivan's Malayalam movie, Endless Summer. Apart from acting, he is well known for hosting the shows D 4 Dance and Still Standing on Mazhavil Manorama.

Early life
Adil Ibrahim has his roots at Tirur, Malappuram, Kerala, India. He was born in Dubai, United Arab Emirates. He pursued his academic career from New Indian Model School and Birla Institute of Technology and Science, Pilani – Dubai Campus. 
After completing his graduation in engineering, he worked for nearly two years before leaving the job to pursue a career in acting.

Career
In 2009, Adil Ibrahim started his TV anchoring career with the Malayalam channel Asianet with You, Me and Dubai, a program based on Dubai Shopping festival and Magic Carpet, an Arabian Travelogue on the same channel. Adil has also been associated with Amrita TV and Media One channel anchoring their shows.

Adil Ibrahim was an RJ and producer at RadioMe (100.3 FM Dubai) for almost 2 years. As an RJ, he was doing the breakfast show, Morning Madness on the RadioMe programs Ramadan Nights and Cocktail. He hosted D3 - D4 Dance Show Season 3 on Mazhavil Manorama and hosts Still Standing in the same channel.

His Notable characters and movies are Sudev from Nirnnayakam, Abey from Achayans, Dr.Rahul from Nine, Riju from Lucifer, Arun rajeev in Mohan Kumar Fans and Abin in Cheraathukal.

Filmography

Film

Short films

Television

References

External links
 

Living people
1988 births
Indian male film actors
Indian expatriates in the United Arab Emirates
Male actors in Malayalam cinema
Television personalities from Kerala
21st-century Indian male actors
Indian game show hosts
Indian radio presenters